Fairwood Park Golf Club is a golf club based on the Gower Peninsula, Wales. It is the only 'Championship' status golf course on the Gower Peninsula, having twice hosted the Welsh PGA Championships.

The clubhouse was previously a secret RAF Hospital during World War II.

References

Caerphilly
Golf clubs and courses in Wales